Griphodon is an extinct genus of mammals, belonging to the order Pyrotheria. It lived during the Middle Eocene, in what is now Peru.

Description

All that is known about this animal is a fragment of a mandible complete with teeth.  Its teeth were two-crested, slightly more transversal than in other genera such as Carolozittelia, but there are indications of the presence of a longitudinal crest, and even, in the third premolar, of a complete crest, not found in Pyrotherium.

Classification

Griphodon peruvianus was first described in 1924 by Anthony, who considered it to be a Perissodactyl. The fragmentary fossil was found near Chicoca, along the Huallaga River. Subsequently the genus was considered a basal member of the Pyrotheres, a mysterious clade of heavy-shaped mammals from the Early Cenozoic of South America, of uncertain affinities. Other fossils attributed to Griphodon were later found near Contamana in the Loreto Province of Peru.

Paleoecology

Griphodon seems to had a diet mainly composed of tough plants, which were crushed by its powerful crested teeth.

Bibliography
H. E. Anthony. 1924. A new fossil perissodactyl from Peru. American Museum Novitates 111:1-3
B. J. Shockey and F. Anaya-Daza. 2004. Pyrotherium macfaddeni, sp. nov. (late Oligocene, Bolivia) and the pedal morphology of pyrotheres. Journal of Vertebrate Paleontology 24(2):481-488
P. Antoine, M. A. Abello, S. Adnet, A. J. Altamirano Sierra, P. Baby, G. Billet, M. Boivin, Y. Calderón, A. Candela, J. Chabain, F. Corfu, D. A. Croft, M. Ganerød, C. Jaramillo, S. Klaus, L. Marivaux, R. E. Navarrete, M. J. Orliac, F. Parra, M. E. Pérez, F. Pujos, J. Rage, and A. R. 2016. A 60-million-year Cenozoic history of western Amazonian ecosystems in Contamana, eastern Peru. Gondwana Research 31:30-59

Meridiungulata
Eocene mammals of South America
Paleogene Peru
Fossils of Peru
Fossil taxa described in 1924
Prehistoric placental genera